The Wyoming Army National Guard is the Army National Guard of Wyoming. It includes army aviation, construction engineers, field artillery and medical asset units. It was reorganized in 1996, consolidating its two field artillery battalions into a single battalion. A ribbon bridge company and rear operations center for an infantry division were added to the Guard.

It is administered by the Wyoming Military Department, part of the Wyoming state government. The Wyoming Military Department's goal is to provide a trained, quality-based force, supported by appropriate equipment, facilities and real property, technology, and services to successfully execute state and federal missions.

History
The Wyoming Army National Guard was established in 1870, during the Wyoming Territory period, when territorial Governor John A. Campbell authorized the division of the Wyoming Territory into three military districts. On December 31, 1871, a law passed by the Wyoming Territorial Assembly gave legal sanction to volunteer militia companies of not less than 40 men.

The first federally recognized Wyoming unit was Company A, 1st Wyoming Regiment: The Laramie Grays, organized in 1888. The Laramie Grays were followed by the organization of Company B: The Cheyenne Guard the same year. Several other units including the Cheyenne Rangers, the 1st Regiment, the Wyoming Home Guard, and the Wyoming Rangers were formed because of concerns over conflicts with Native American tribes but were short-lived.

When Wyoming became a state in 1890, constitutional provisions allowed for the formation of units in Buffalo, Evanston, Douglas, Green River, Rock Springs, Rawlins and Sheridan.

Wyoming's first artillery unit, Battery A, and a regimental band were formed in May, 1894. The artillery unit was equipped with two three-inch Hotchkiss guns, drawn by horse.

The Wyoming National Guard was first federally mobilized during the Spanish–American War in 1898. Since then, the Guard has seen active service in the Mexican Punitive Campaign, World War I, World War II, the Berlin Crisis and Korea. Wyoming Guard units have also served in Desert Storm, the Bosnia peacekeeping force, Operation Iraqi Freedom, Operation Enduring Freedom and Hurricane Katrina response.

The Wyoming National Guard 300th Armored Field Artillery Battalion was commemorated in 1983 as part of the National Guard Heritage Painting series at the Pentagon for their combat action during the Battle of Soyang during the Korean War.

Units
 Joint Forces Headquarters (JFHQ)
 WY ARNG Medical Detachment
 Recruiting and Retention Battalion
 Training Site Command
 Detachment 53, Operational Support Airlift Command
 94th Troop Command
 67th Army Band
 133rd Engineer Company
  G Company, 2nd Battalion, 211th Aviation Regiment
  C Company, 1st Battalion, 297th Infantry Regiment
 197th Public Affairs Detachment (197th PAD)
  115th Field Artillery Brigade (115th FAB)
 2nd Battalion, 300th Field Artillery Regiment (2-300th FAR) 
 148th Signal Company
 920th Forward Support Company (920th FSC)
 960th Brigade Support Battalion (960th BSB)
 213th Regional Training Institute (213th RTI)

References

External links
Official website

United States Army National Guard by state
Military units and formations established in 1870